Saint-Louis is the fifth-largest commune in the French overseas department of Réunion. It is located on the southwest part of the island of Réunion, adjacent to Saint-Pierre.

Geography

Climate

Saint-Louis has a tropical savanna climate (Köppen climate classification Aw).

Population

See also
Communes of the Réunion department

References

External links

 City council website (in French)

Communes of Réunion